{{Speciesbox
| image = Periscaria Elatior.jpg
| genus = Persicaria
| species = elatior| authority = (R.Br.) K.L.Wilson
| synonyms = Polygonum elatius R.Br.
}}Persicaria elatior'', commonly known as tall knotweed, is a species of flowering plant native to eastern Australia. It was one of eleven species selected for the Save a Species Walk campaign in April 2016; scientists walked 300 km to raise money for collection of seeds to be prepared and stored at the Australian PlantBank at the Australian Botanic Garden, Mount Annan.

References

Flora of New South Wales
Perennial plants
elatior